This is a list of compositions by Bohuslav Martinů by category. The date and place after each work are the date and place of origin. The catalog numbers with the prefix "H" are based on the comprehensive catalog of Martinů's works prepared by the Belgian musicologist Harry Halbreich, which was first published in 1968. A second revised and expanded edition was completed in 2006.

Operas 
Voják a tanečnice (Soldier and Dancer), comic opera in three acts, H 162 (composed 1927 at Polička)
Les larmes du couteau (Tears of the Knife), opera in one act, H 169 (1928 Paris)
Les Trois Souhaits ou Les vicissitudes de la vie (Three Wishes or Inconstancy of Life), film-opera in 3 acts with prelude and postlude, H 175 (1929 Paris)
Le jour de bonté (Day of Kindness), opera in 3 acts, H 194 (1931 Paris)
Hry o Marii (The Miracles of Mary), H 236 (1934 Paris)
Hlas lesa (The Voice of the Forest), radio opera in 1 act, H 243 (1935 Paris)
Veselohra na mostě (Comedy on the Bridge), radio opera in 1 act, H 247 (1935 Paris)
Divadlo za branou (Theatre Behind the Gate), opera-ballet in 3 acts, H 251 (1936 Paris)
Julietta (Snář) (Julietta (The key to Dreams)), lyric opera in 3 acts, H 253 (1937 Paris)
Dvakrát Alexandr (Alexandre Bis, Alexander Twice), opera buffa in 1 act, H 255 (1937 Paris)
What Men Live By, opera-pastorale in 1 act, H 336 (1952 New York)
The Marriage, Comic Opera in 2 Acts, H 341 (1952 New York)
Plainte contre inconnu (Accusation Against the Unknown), Opera in 3 Acts, H 344 (1953 Nice)
Mirandolina, comic opera in 3 acts, H 346 (1953 Nice)
Ariane, lyric opera in 1 act, H 370 (1958 Schönenberg-Pratteln)
The Greek Passion, Opera in 4 acts, H 372 (1957, 2nd version 1959)

Ballets 
Noc (Night), ballet in 1 act, H 89 (1914 Polička)
Tance se závoji (Dances with a Veils), meloplastic dance scenes, H 93 (1914 Polička)
Stín (The Shadow), ballet in 1 act, H 102 (1916 Polička)
Koleda (Christmas Carol), ballet in 4 acts with singing, dancing and recitation, H 112 (1917 Polička)
Istar, ballet in 3 acts, H 130 (1921 Polička, Prague)
Kdo je na světě nejmocnější? (Who is the Most Powerful in the World?), ballet comedy in 1 act, H 133 (1922 Prague)
Vzpoura (The Revolt), ballet sketch in 1 act, H 151 (1925 Paris, Prague)
Motýl, který dupal (The Butterfly that Stamped), ballet in 1 act, H 153 (1926 Paris)
Le Raid merveilleux (The Amazing Flight), mechanical ballet, H 159 (1927 Paris)
La Revue de cuisine (The Kitchen Revue), jazz-ballet in 1 act, H 161 (1927 Paris)
On Tourne, ballet in 1 act, H 163 (1927 Polička)
Check to the King, jazz-ballet in 2 acts, H 186 (1930 Paris)
Špalíček (The Chap-Book), ballet with singing in 3 acts, H 214 (1932 Paris)
Le jugement de Paris (The judgement of Paris), ballet in 1 act, H 245 (1935 Paris)
The Strangler, ballet for three dancers, H 317 (1948 New York)

Orchestral

Symphonies 
Symphony No. 1, H 289 (1942 United States)
Symphony No. 2, H 295 (1943 Darien, Conn.)
Symphony No. 3, H 299 (1944 Ridgefield, Conn.)
Symphony No. 4, H 305 (1945 New York)
Symphony No. 5, H 310 (1946 New York)
Symphony No. 6 Fantaisies symphoniques, H 343 (1953 New York, Paris)

Others 
Half-time, rondo for large orchestra, H 142 (1924 Polička)
La Bagarre, Allegro for large orchestra, H 155 (1926 Paris)
Rhapsody (Allegro Symphonique), for large orchestra, H 171 (1928 Paris)
Partita, for string orchestra, H 212 (1931 Paris)
Sinfonia Concertante for Two Orchestras, H 219 (1932 Paris)
Concerto Grosso, for chamber orchestra, H 263 (1937 Paris)
 Tri Ricercari for chamber orchestra, H 267
Double Concerto for Two String Orchestras, Piano, and Timpani, H 271 (1938 Vieux Moulin, Schönenberg)
Memorial to Lidice, H 296 (1943 New York)
Thunderbolt P-47, scherzo for orchestra, H 309 (1945 Cape Cod)
Toccata e Due Canzoni, H 311 (1946 New York)
Sinfonietta La Jolla for piano and chamber orchestra in A major, H 328 (1950 New York)
Overture for Orchestra H 345 (1953 Nice)
The Frescoes of Piero della Francesca, H 352 (1955 Nice)
The Rock, Symphonic Prelude for Large Orchestra, H 363 (1957 Rome)
The Parables, H 367 (1958 Rome, Schönenberg)
Estampes for Orchestra, H 369 (1958 Schönenberg)

Concertos

Piano 
, H 149 (1925 Polička)
Divertimento (Concertino) in G for left-hand piano and small orchestra, H 173 (1926–1928 Paris)
Piano Concerto No. 2, H 237 (1934 Paris [Malakoff])
Concertino for Piano and Orchestra, H 269 (1938 Paris)
Sinfonietta Giocosa for piano and chamber orchestra, H 282 (1940 Aix-en-Provence)
Piano Concerto No. 3, H 316 (1948 New York)
 "Incantations", H 358 (1956 New York)
Piano Concerto No. 5 "Fantasia concertante" in B flat major, H 366 (1958 Schönenberg-Pratteln)

Violin 
Violin Concerto No. 1, H 226 (1933 Paris)
Violin Concerto No. 2, H 293 (1943 New York)
Concerto da Camera, for violin and string orchestra with piano and percussion, H 285 (1941 Edgartown, Mass.)
Czech Rhapsody for violin and orchestra, H 307 A [see H 307] (1945 Cape Cod, South Orleans, Mass.)
Suite Concertante for Violin and Orchestra in D major, H 276 I (1939 Paris), H 276 II (1944 New York)
Concerto for Violin and Piano, H 13 (1910)

Cello 
Cello Concerto No. 1 in D, H 196 I (1930 Polička), H 196 II (1939 Paris), H 196 III (1955 Nice)
Cello Concerto No. 2, H 304 (1945 New York)
Concertino for Cello, Winds, Percussion and Piano in C minor, H 143 (1924 Paris)

Other solo instruments 
, H 246 (1935 Paris)
Rhapsody Concerto, for viola and orchestra, H 337 (1952 New York)
Concerto for Oboe and Small Orchestra, H 353 (1955 Nice)

Multiple instruments 
Concerto for String Quartet and Orchestra, H 207 (1931 Paris)
Serenade (Divertimento) for Violin, Viola and Chamber Orchestra, H 215 (1932)
Concertino for Piano Trio (Violin, Cello and Piano) and String Orchestra, H 231 (1933 Paris)
Concerto for Flute, Violin and Orchestra, H 252 (1936 Paris)
 Duo Concertante (Concerto No. 1) for Two Violins and Orchestra, H 264 (1937 Nice)
Concerto for Two Pianos and Orchestra, H 292 (1943 New York)
Sinfonia Concertante No. 2 in B-flat major (Violin, Cello, Oboe, Bassoon and Orchestra with Piano), H 322 (1949 New York)
Concerto for Two Violins and Orchestra No. 2 in D major, H 329 (1950 New York)
Concerto for Violin, Piano, and Orchestra, H 342 (1953 New York)

Vocal 
Česká Rapsodie (Czech Rhapsody), cantata for baritone, mixed chorus, orchestra and organ, H 118 (1918 Polička)
Svatební košile (The Spectre's Bride), Ballad for soprano, tenor, bass, mixed chorus and orchestra, H 214 I A (1932)
Dvě pisně na texty negerské poezie (Two songs with lyrics from black poetry), for vocal solo and piano, H 232 (1932 Paris)
 Kytice (Bouquet of Flowers), Cycle on Folk Texts for Radio for soprano, alto, tenor, bass, children's chorus, mixed chorus and small orchestra, H 260 (1937); words by František Sušil and Karel Jaromír Erben
Polní mše (Field Mass), cantata for baritone, male chorus and orchestra, H 279 (1939 Paris)
Písnicky na dve stránky (Songs on two pages, seven songs and Moravian folk poetry), for vocal solo and piano, H 302
Gilgameš (The Epic of Gilgamesh), oratorio for soli, mixed chorus and orchestra, H 351 (1955 Nice)
Otvírání studánek (The Opening of the Wells), cantata for soli, female chorus and instrumental accompaniment, H 354 (1955 Nice)
Legenda z dýmu bramborové nati (Legend of the Smoke from Potato Fires), cantata for soli, mixed chorus and instrumental accompaniment, H 360 (1956 Rome)
Romance z pampelišek (The Romance of the Dandelions), cantata for mixed chorus a cappella and soprano solo, H 364 (1957 Rome)

Chamber

Duos for violin and piano 
Violin sonatas
Violin Sonata in C major, H 120 (1919 Polička)
Violin Sonata in D minor, H 152 (1926 Paris)
Violin Sonata No. 1, H 182 (1929 Paris)
Violin Sonata No. 2, H 208 (1931 Paris)
Violin Sonata No. 3, H 303 (1944 New York)
Other
Impromptu, H 166 (1927 Paris)
Cinq pièces brèves (Five short pieces), H 184 (1930 Paris)
Romance, H 186bis (1930 Paris)
Études rythmiques (7 pieces), H 202 (1932 Paris)
Intermezzo, H 261 (1937 Paris)
Sonatina, H 262 (1937 Paris)
Five Madrigal Stanzas, H 297 (1943 New York) – dedicated to Albert Einstein
Czech Rhapsody, H 307 (1945 Cape Cod, South Orleans, Mass.)

Duos for cello and piano 
Cello sonatas
Cello Sonata No. 1, H 277 (1939 Paris)
Cello Sonata No. 2, H 286 (1941 Jamaica, Long Island)
Cello Sonata No. 3, H 340 (1952 Vieux-Moulin)
Other
Ariette, H 188B (1930 Paris)
Nocturnes, H 189 (1931 Paris)
Pastorals, H 190 (1931 Paris)
Miniature Suite, H 192 (1931 Paris)
Seven Arabesques, H 201 (1931 Paris)
Variations on a Theme of Rossini, H 290 (1942 New York)
Variations on a Slovak Folk Song, H 378 (1959 Schönenberg-Pratteln)

Duos for other instruments and piano 
Scherzo for Flute and Piano, H 174 A (1929 Paris) (see also Sextetts, H 174)
Flute Sonata (1945), H 306
Viola Sonata (1955), H 355
Clarinet Sonatina, H 356
Trumpet Sonatina (1957), H 357

Duos for other instruments without piano 
Duo No. 1 (Preludium – Rondo) for Violin and Cello, H 157 (1927 Paris)
Three Madrigals (Duett No. 1) for Violin and Viola, H 313 (1947 New York)
Duet No. 2 for Violin and Viola, H 331 (1950 New York)
Divertimento for Two Recorders, H 365 (1957 Rome)
Duo No. 2 for Violin and Cello in D major, H 371 (1958 Schönenberg-Pratteln)
Piece for Two Cellos, H 377 (1959 Schönenberg-Pratteln)

Trios 
String trios
String Trio No. 1, H 136 (1923 Paris)
String Trio No. 2, H 238 (1934 Paris)
Piano trios
Piano Trio No. 1, H 193 (1930 Paris)
Piano Trio No. 2 in D minor, H 327 (1950 New York)
Piano Trio No. 3 in C major, H 332 (1951 New York)
Bergerettes, five pieces for piano trio, H 275 (1939 Paris)
Two violins and piano
Sonatina for Two Violins and Piano, H 198 (1930 Paris)
Sonata for Two Violins and Piano, H 213 (1932 Paris)
Flute, violin and keyboard
Sonata for Flute, Violin and Piano, H 254 (1937 Paris)
Promenades for Flute, Violin and Harpsichord, H 274 (1939 Paris)
Madrigal-Sonata for Flute, Violin and Piano, H 291 (1942 New York )
Other trios
Serenade No. 2, for two violins and viola, H 216 (1932 Paris)
Trio for Flute, Violin and Bassoon, H 265 (1937 Nice)
Four Madrigals, for oboe, clarinet and bassoon, H 266 (1938 Nice)
Trio for Flute, Cello and Piano, H 300 (1944 Ridgefield, Conn.)

Quartets 
String quartets
Tři Jezdci, H 1 (1902 Polička), aka Three Riders/Three Horsemen
String Quartet, H 60 (1912 Polička), lost
Two Nocturnes, H 63 (1912 Polička), lost
Andante, H 64 (1912 Polička), lost
String Quartet in E-flat minor, H 103 (1917 Polička), previously lost, reconstructed by Aleš Březina
String Quartet No. 1, H 117 (1918 Polička)
String Quartet No. 2, H 150 (1925 Paris)
String Quartet No. 3, H 183 (1929 Paris)
String Quartet No. 4, H 256 (1937 Paris)
String Quartet No. 5, H 268 (1938 Paris)
String Quartet No. 6, H 312 (1946 New York)
String Quartet No. 7 Concerto da camera, H 314 (1947 New York)
Other quartets
Quartet for clarinet, horn, cello & side-drum, H 139
, H 287 (1942 Jamaica, Long Island, New York)
Oboe Quartet (oboe, violin, cello, and piano), H 315 (1947 New York), 13'
Mazurka-Nocturne (oboe, 2 violins, cello), H 325 (1949 Renova, Haute-Savoie), 7'

Quintets 
Piano Quintet, H 35 (1911 Polička)
 (2 violins, 2 violas, and cello), H 164 (1927 Polička), 18'
Piano Quintet No. 1, H 229 (1933 Paris), 19'
, H 298 (1944 New York), 28'
 (violin, viola, cello, & 2 clarinets), H 334 (1951 New York), 24'

Sextets 
Sextet for Winds and Piano in E-flat major, H 174 (1929 Paris), 15'
Serenade I (2 clarinets, horn, 3 violins, viola), H 217 (1932 Paris), 7'
 (2 violins, 2 violas, 2 cellos), H 224 (1932 Paris), 18'
Musique de Chambre No. 1 "Les fêtes nocturnes" (violin, viola, cello, clarinet, harp, and piano), H 376 (1959 Schönenberg-Pratteln), 19'

Septets 
Les Rondes (oboe, clarinet, bassoon, trumpet, 2 violins, piano), H 200 (recte 199) (1930 Paris), 14'
Serenade III (oboe, clarinet, 4 violins, cello), H 218 (1932 Paris), 7' 30"
Fantasia for theremin (or ondes Martenot), Oboe, String Quartet and Piano, H 301 (1944 Ridgefield, Conn.), 15'

Octet 
Posvícení (Der Fasching) Ein Dorfbild, H 2 (1907 Polička), 7'

Nonets 
Nonet No. 1 (wind quintet, string trio and piano), H 144 (1925 Paris), fragment
Stowe pastorals (five recorders, clarinet, two violins and cello), H 335 (1951 New York), 10'
 (wind quintet, string trio and double bass), H 374 (1959 Schönenberg-Pratteln), 16'

Keyboard

Piano 
Sonata for Piano, H 350 (1954 – Nice, France)
 Ritornels (Les Ritournelles), H 227 (1932)
 Fantasie et Toccata, H 281 (1940)
Film en miniature, H 148 (1925)
Three Czech Dances, H 154
 Adagio-Memories, H 362 (1957)
 Seven Czech Dances, H 195
 Crotchets and Quavers (Čtvrtky a osminky), H 257
Loutky (Puppets) (3 books, numbered by Martinů in reverse chronological order) 
Loutky I, H 137 (1924 – Polička, Czechoslovakia/Paris, France)
Loutky II, H 116 (1918 – Polička, Czechoslovakia)
Loutky III, H 92 (1914 – Polička, Czechoslovakia)
Etudes and Polkas, H 308 (1945 – South Orleans, Cape Cod, MA, USA) [3 books]
Dumka (unnumbered), H 4 (1909 – Polička, Czechoslovakia)
Dumka No. 1, H 249 (1936 – Paris, France)
Dumka No. 2, H 250 (1936 – Paris, France)
Dumka No. 3, H 285bis (1941 – Jamaica, NY, USA)

Two Pianos 
 Three Czech Dances, H 324 (1949)

Harpsichord 
Deux Pièces pour Clavecin, H 244 (1935 Paris)
Harpsichord Sonata, H 368 (1958 Schönenberg-Pratteln)
Two Impromptus, H 381 (1959 Schönenberg-Pratteln)

Organ 
Vigilie, H 382 (1959 Schönenberg-Pratteln) (unfinished, completed by Bedřich Janáček)

Table

See also 
 Bohuslav Martinů Complete Edition

Notes 

Sonatina for Clarinet and Piano (B. Martinu) == External links ==
Bohuslav Martinů Foundation in Prague

Martinu
 
Martinu